Calera is a town in Bryan County, Oklahoma, United States, located five miles south of Durant and 10 miles north of the Oklahoma-Texas state line. The population was 2,906 at the 2020 census, an increase of 34.2 percent over the figure of 2,164 recorded in 2010 indicating that Calera is experiencing larger growth than Durant and other surrounding areas. It is part of the Durant Micropolitan Area, as well as being part of the Texoma region.

Geography
Calera is located at  (33.934260, -96.428392).

The Calera town limits borders the Southern Durant city limits, but the actual downtown areas of Calera and Durant are five miles apart.

History
Calera was formerly known as Cale Switch or Cale, when in 1872 the Missouri, Kansas and Texas Railway built a railroad through the Choctaw Nation, and the small community was established on the east side of the tracks. The name Cale came from railroad official George W. Cale. Seventeen years later, the people of Cale Switch, Indian Territory had their first post office. That same year the town was given the name Sterrett, but Katy, also referred to as Missouri, Kansas, and Texas Railway, railroad officials refused to call it by that name. The debate continued for twenty-one years when finally in 1910 the town accepted the name Calera.

At the time of its founding Cale was located in Blue County, a part of the Moshulatubbee District of the Choctaw Nation.

Demographics

As of the updated census report of 2020, the population of the town was 2,906. The population density is 1,134.1 inhabitants per square mile (437.7/km2). The racial makeup of the town is 74.5% White, 10.6% African American, 9.8% Native American, 0.6% Asian, 0.5% from other races, and 4.0% from two or more races. Hispanic or Latino of any race makes up 3.6% of the population.

There are 1,185 households, out of which 32.9% have children under the age of 18 living with them, 47.8% are married couples living together, 14.8% have a female householder with no husband present, and 32.6% are non-families. 27.7% of all households are made up of individuals, and 11.5% have someone living alone who is 65 years of age or older. The average household size is 2.44 and the average family size is 2.96.

In the town, the population is spread out, with 24.7% under the age of 18, 8.4% from 18 to 24, 27.2% from 25 to 44, 26.4% from 45 to 64, and 13.4% who are 65 years of age or older. The median age is 38.8 years. For every 100 females, there are 97.6 males. For every 100 females age 18 and over, there are 92.3 males.

The median income for a household in the town is $47,181, and the median income for a family is $54,201. Males have a median income of $38,397 versus $29,915 for females. The per capita income for the town is $23,561. About 13.8% of families and 17.2% of the population are below the poverty line, including 26.5% of those under age 18 and 8.5% of those age 65 or over.

Economy
Calera is a growing town with a thriving tourism industry, thanks to the nearby Choctaw Casinos & Resorts, which attracts many travelers and tourists to the area. The town has seen significant economic growth in recent years, with an increase in new eating establishments such as Sonic Drive-In, Subway, Los Arcos Mexican Restaurant, Simple Simons Pizza, and Taco Casa. Visitors can also enjoy the world-renowned Okie donuts owned by the Wines Family. 

In addition to its tourism industry, Calera is actively recruiting businesses that can contribute to the town's sales tax revenue. With a sales tax rate of 9%, which includes state, county, and city taxes, businesses in Calera have the potential to generate significant revenue. Calera also owns several properties that are available for retail businesses interested in starting or expanding in the town.

Despite its small size, Calera has a number of thriving small businesses that contribute to the town's economic success. These include Carriage Point Family Medicine, Calera Urgent Care, Calera Groceries, and several other businesses.

Overall, Calera is a business-friendly town with many opportunities for entrepreneurs and established businesses.

Transportation
Calera is situated along U.S. 69/75, the second busiest north-south route in Oklahoma, after Interstate 35. The Union Pacific Railroad runs through Calera on the East Side of US 69/75

Educational system
Calera is home to Calera Public Schools which is currently classified as 2A by the OSSAA (Oklahoma Secondary Schools Activities Association). The average enrollment is approximately 700 students. The school mascot is the Calera Bulldogs and Lady Bulldogs. The schools consist of Calera Early Childhood, Calera Elementary, and Calera High School. Calera Early Childhood is for children who are between the grades of Head-Start and First Grade. The Elementary School is for students who are between the grades of Second and Sixth. Calera High School consists of students between Seventh and Twelfth grads.

Extracurricular Activities
In 1995, Calera High School's Academic team won the Oklahoma Secondary Schools Activities Association State Championship. Through the years, the Academic Team has continued to be successful.  The Calera boys' basketball program has advanced to the state tournament seven times, and is home to the 1956 Class B Boys State Champions.  In 2014, the Calera girls' softball basketball team was named Area Quarterfinalist. Calera is also home to three individual cross-country state champions, as well as three 1600m state champions, won by former East Central University cross-country runner, Cale Eidson.  The Calera softball team has been successful in the last few years.  In the 2014, 2015, and 2016 Slow-Pitch season the girls advanced to the state tournament. the 2014 season was the first time any girls' team at Calera High School had made it to a state tournament.  The local FFA Chapter was named Three Star National FFA Chapter and the National Convention form 2007 through 2011, and has experienced major successes in Career Development Events at the State and National levels.

Notable people
Famous Calera residents include:
 Jason Meadows, Country music artist and Nashville Star runner-Up
 Cale Eidson, Runner and ECU Male Athlete of the Year nominee

References

External links
 Encyclopedia of Oklahoma History and Culture - Calera

Towns in Bryan County, Oklahoma
Towns in Oklahoma